Noémie Raths (born 8 December 1989) is a Luxembourger footballer who plays as a defender. She is a member of the Luxembourg women's national team.

References

1989 births
Living people
Women's association football defenders
Luxembourgian women's footballers
Luxembourg women's international footballers